Keezhur Kunnu or Keezhoor Kunnu, also known as Keezhur Theru, is a small town near Iritty, in Kannur district, Kerala.

Majority of the people living in this area belong to the Saliya caste. So this place also named as Theru.

Kaavootu Paramba Sri  Ganapathi Mahadeva Kshethram
The temple belong to the Saliya community residing in this particular "THERU",The temple has got various historical stories behind this.

This place accommodates more than hundreds of Saliya families. The head of the temple is known as "MOOTHA CHETIYAR"

The Saliya community prays to Lord Ganapathy, one of the main Deva in this temple along with SIVA(MAHADEVA), Gulikan, Vettakkorumakan, Muthachiyamma, Bhagavathy.

The temple has got historical connection with Famous Kottiyoor Perumal temple.

Educational institutions
Mahatma Gandhi College, Keezhur Kunnu was founded by Iritty Educational Society and is affiliated to the Kannur University. Initially the college was affiliated to University of Calicut.

There is also an English medium school, SDA English Medium School, which follows the Indian Certificate of Secondary Education syllabus.

Transportation
The national highway passes through Kannur town.  Mangalore and Mumbai can be accessed on the northern side and Cochin and Thiruvananthapuram can be accessed on the southern side.  The road to the east of Iritty connects to Mysore and Bangalore.   The nearest railway station is Kannur on Mangalore-Palakkad line. There are airports at Mangalore and Calicut.

References

Villages near Iritty